Christina Malling Siggaard (born 24 March 1994) is a Danish former professional racing cyclist, who rode professionally between 2014 and 2021 for the Firefighters Upsala CK,  and  teams. Siggaard represented Denmark at the 2015 European Games in the women's road race, and also represented Denmark at the UCI Road World Championships and the European Road Championships.

She now works as a commentator and analyst for Danish broadcaster TV 2 Sport's cycling coverage.

Major results

2010
 National Road Championships
2nd Road race
3rd Junior time trial
2011
 3rd  Road race, UCI Junior Road World Championships
 3rd Time trial, National Junior Road Championships
2012
 7th Time trial, UCI Junior Road World Championships
2014
 2nd Road race, National Road Championships
2015
 3rd Road race, National Road Championships
2016
 4th Overall Ladies Tour of Norway
 7th Grand Prix de Dottignies
2017
 5th Overall Tour of Chongming Island
 5th Pajot Hills Classic
 10th Le Samyn des Dames
2018
 1st Omloop Het Nieuwsblad
 3rd Road race, National Road Championships
 6th Road race, UEC European Road Championships
 8th Omloop van het Hageland
 10th Three Days of Bruges–De Panne
2019
 1st Stage 1 BeNe Ladies Tour
 3rd Road race, National Road Championships
 9th Omloop Het Nieuwsblad
 9th Omloop van het Hageland

See also
 List of 2015 UCI Women's Teams and riders

References

External links
 

1994 births
Living people
Danish female cyclists
People from Skanderborg Municipality
Cyclists at the 2015 European Games
European Games competitors for Denmark
Sportspeople from the Central Denmark Region
21st-century Danish women